The Patriotic Party was a far right political party in the United Kingdom.

The group began life as the True Tories in 1962 when Major-General Richard Hilton, formerly a leading member of the League of Empire Loyalists, set up his own nationalistic group with a membership largely made up of former military figures. The group adopted the "Patriotic Party" name for the 1964 general election and sponsored two candidates. During the campaign the party split, with Deputy Chairman and former Liberal Party election candidate Major Arthur Braybrooke continuing the Patriotic Party and General Hilton re-establishing the True Tories. The two candidates polled only 1,108 votes between them and Braybrooke's candidacy in the 1966 general election attracted even less support.

Hilton's True Tories failed to take off and he became associated with the 1960s British National Party, before the remnants of both the Patriotic Party and the True Tories were absorbed by the National Front upon its foundation in 1967.

Election results

1964 UK general election

1966 UK general election

References

Defunct political parties in the United Kingdom
Political parties established in 1964
Far-right political parties in the United Kingdom